Tappeh Dibi (also Romanized as Tappeh Dībee, Tapeh Dibi, Tappah Dībī, Tappehdībī, and Tappeh Dībī; also known as Tepe Dapi) is a village in Boghrati Rural District, Sardrud District, Razan County, Hamadan Province, Iran. At the 2006 census, its population was 1,033, in 186 families.

References 

Populated places in Razan County